"Lisa Gets the Blues" is the seventeenth episode of the twenty-ninth season of the American animated television series The Simpsons, and the 635th episode of the series overall. It aired in the United States on Fox on April 22, 2018.

The episode was dedicated in memory of R. Lee Ermey who had guest starred twice on the show as Colonel Leslie "Hap" Hapablap in the episodes "Sideshow Bob's Last Gleaming" and "Waiting for Duffman". He died on April 15, 2018.

Plot
Beginning after part of the opening sequence, Mr. Largo discourages Lisa from playing the saxophone on the account that, no matter how hard she tries, some people will be better than her, a claim supported by Principal Skinner. Meanwhile, Homer, Marge, Bart and Maggie wait for Lisa to take part in a lumberjack-themed couch gag. At home, Marge attempts to make Lisa play in front of the family, but is unable to. Looking in the Internet, she finds out she has an incurable disorder called "The YIPS", which disable an expert performer for no reason whatsoever.

Marge plans a trip to Gainesville, Florida, much to the dismay of the rest of the Simpson family, for the 100th birthday of Marge's half-great-aunt Eunice, in hopes that Lisa will regain her confidence. Homer expects that the plane is disrupted to avoid going, but not even a passenger seated between two morbidly obese passengers is willing to protest. Bart then kicks the seat before him, creating a domino effect that degenerates into a fight which finally forces the plane to change its destination to New Orleans, much to the passengers' relief. Marge decides to approach the trip to cheer Lisa up, but decides to give up after Lisa mopes about the band celebrating 98% humidity. Marge resolves that Homer would handle the situation better.

While unsuccessfully trying to make Lisa happy, Homer goes on an "eating binge" throughout the city's numerous restaurants, eventually barfing at New Orleans' "vomitoriums". While visiting the city's landmarks, he and Lisa find a statue of Louis Armstrong that comes to life upon Lisa's wish. Louis urges Lisa to enjoy the city and listen to Homer. Meanwhile, Marge tries to make New Orleans interesting for Bart, whose boredom subsides upon finding a voodoo shop, where he plots revenge against Jimbo, Dolph and Kearney after they made him act as Little Orphan Annie in front of the cafeteria (down to having his pupils whitened with correction fluid) because of a prank Bart made on Jimbo, knowing he uses his hat to cover his baldness.

The bandleader of The Spotted Cat, a jazz bar Lisa and Homer go in, calls Lisa by name, actually being "Bleeding Gums" Murphy's nephew, the deceased jazzman (whose name was apparently Oscar) telling him that Lisa was the most promising musician he knew (much to his nephew's chagrin). He finally convinces Lisa to play his sax in spite of her protests, rekindling her love for the instrument. Back in Springfield, she keeps on playing, and the ghost of Louis Armstrong reappears, sadly wishing he was alive again.

The post-credits scene features Homer, Lisa and Bart eating beignets at the Café Du Monde. Homer comments that next week's episode will surpass Gunsmoke's episode count. When Bart mentions Gunsmoke's radio show (which lasted for 432 episodes), Homer force-feeds Bart with a beignet.

Reception
Dennis Perkins of The A.V. Club gave this episode a C+, stating, "It’s momentarily affecting, especially with Smith giving voice to Lisa’s pain, but 'Lisa Gets The Blues' quickly scatters any intention of recapturing the old Lisa Simpson tragicomic resonance over a succession of self-referential gags, inconsistently sketched character beats, and some of the most indulgent tourist rubbernecking the show has ever done."

"Lisa Gets the Blues" scored a 4 share and was watched by 2.19 million people, making it Fox's highest rated show of the night.

References

2018 American television episodes
The Simpsons (season 29) episodes
Television episodes set in New Orleans